Neil Francis Tennant (born 10 July 1954) is an English singer, songwriter and music journalist, and co-founder of the synth-pop duo Pet Shop Boys, which he formed with Chris Lowe in 1981. He was a journalist for Smash Hits, and assistant editor for the magazine in the mid-1980s.

Tennant coined the phrase imperial phase to describe the period in which a musical artist is regarded to be at their commercial and creative peak simultaneously. This observation was initially self-referential, made as the Pet Shop Boys had achieved commercial success with four British number one hits ("It's a Sin", "What Have I Done to Deserve This", "Heart", and "Always on My Mind"), had received unanimous critical praise for their first three albums, and had expanded their creative horizons through innovative collaborations in the visual and performing arts.

Biography

Early life
Neil Francis Tennant was born in North Shields, a fishing port near Newcastle upon Tyne, to William W. Tennant (1923–2009), a sales representative, and Sheila M. (Watson) Tennant (1923–2008). He has an older sister, Susan, and two younger brothers, Simon and Philip. The family moved to a semi-detached house in Greenfield Road (opposite the corner of South Bend), Brunton Park, a relatively affluent suburb in Newcastle, shortly after Neil was born.

As a child, Tennant attended St Cuthbert's Grammar School, an all-boys' Catholic school in Newcastle upon Tyne. His songs "This Must Be the Place I Waited Years to Leave" and "It's a Sin" refer to his early life in Catholic school and the strict upbringing there.

While at school, Tennant played guitar and cello. At age 16, he played in a folk music group called Dust, whose most popular song was called "Can You Hear the Dawn Break?". They were heavily influenced by The Incredible String Band. During his teenage years, he was a member of the youth theatre at the People's Theatre, Newcastle upon Tyne.

Early career
In 1975, having completed a degree in history at North London Polytechnic (now part of London Metropolitan University), Tennant worked for two years as the production editor for Marvel UK, the UK branch of Marvel Comics. He was responsible for anglicising the dialogue of Marvel's catalogue to suit British readers, and for indicating where women needed to be redrawn for the British editions. He also wrote occasional features for the comics, including interviews with pop stars Marc Bolan and Alex Harvey. In 1977, he moved to Macdonald Educational Publishing, where he edited The Dairy Book of Home Management and various illustrated books about cookery, playing the guitar and other home interests. Then he moved to ITV Books, where he edited TV tie-in books. After having commissioned Steve Bush, then the designer of Smash Hits and The Face, to design a book about the group Madness, he was offered a job at Smash Hits as news editor of the British teen pop magazine in 1982. The following year, he became assistant editor. He also edited The Smash Hits Yearbook from 1982 to 1985.

At Smash Hits, an opportunity arose for him to go to New York to interview The Police. While there, Tennant arranged to meet Bobby Orlando, a producer whom he and Lowe admired. Tennant mentioned he was writing songs in his spare time, and Orlando agreed to record some tracks with him and Lowe at a later date. Orlando subsequently produced the Pet Shop Boys' first single, "West End Girls".

Pet Shop Boys

Solo appearances

Alongside his work with Chris Lowe as Pet Shop Boys, Tennant has worked on several side projects including:
In 2017, Tennant duetted with Chrissie Hynde on a song called "Let's Get Lost", which originally appeared on the 2016 album Alone by The Pretenders.
 In 2014, Tennant provided vocal on "Were You There" by Diamond Version.
 In 2008, Tennant's vocals featured in The Killers' Christmas song "Joseph, Better You Than Me" alongside Brandon Flowers and Elton John.
 In 2007, Tennant co-produced Rufus Wainwright's album Release the Stars.
 In June 2006, Tennant provided backing vocals on "Throw" by DJ Fresh.
 In 2005, Tennant provided lyrics and sang on the track "Tranquilizer" by DJ Tom Stephan (a.k.a. Superchumbo). Under numerous guises and aliases, Stephan had previously remixed Pet Shop Boys tracks such as "Paninaro '95", "Minimal", "New York City boy" and "Sexy Northerner".
 In 1998, along with Neil Hannon of The Divine Comedy, Tennant sang backing vocals on the Robbie Williams' single "No Regrets".
 In 1998, he coordinated a charity album Twentieth-Century Blues: The Songs of Noël Coward raising money for Red Hot Organization. The album featured cover versions of songs composed by Noël Coward. In addition to the track "Sail Away" contributed by Pet Shop Boys, Tennant co-produced "There Are Bad Times Just Around the Corner" contributed by Robbie Williams and sang backing vocals on "Twentieth Century Blues" which was contributed by Elton John.
 In April 1996, Tennant's vocals were featured on two live recordings by the British group Suede that were released as b-sides to their single "Filmstar". One track was a cover of the Pet Shop Boys track "Rent", while the second was a duet with Suede singer Brett Anderson on the Suede song "Saturday Night".
 In 1992, his backing vocals featured prominently on the Boy George single The Crying Game and also on the Cicero single Love is Everywhere. Both of which reached the UK Top 40 Singles Chart.
 In 1989, he worked with Electronic, singing backing vocals on their first single "Getting Away with It" and taking lead vocals on the 1992 single "Disappointed". Along with Lowe, he wrote and appeared on the Electronic album track "The Patience of a Saint", on which he shared lead vocals with Bernard Sumner.

Books
 One Hundred Lyrics and a Poem (2018) – a collection of Pet Shop Boys' lyrics and song-by-song commentaries.

Personal life
Tennant is gay, revealing his sexuality in a 1994 interview in Attitude magazine. Otherwise he remains quiet about his personal and romantic life, preferring to be a "man of mystery", as he states it. He maintains a house in London and another one in County Durham in the North East countryside. He and Lowe also have an apartment in Berlin.

Tennant is a patron of the Elton John AIDS Foundation. In 1998, Tennant was named in a list of the biggest private financial donors to the Labour Party. However, in the 2005 general election he voted for the Liberal Democrats, citing disillusionment with Labour's ID card scheme. The Pet Shop Boys agreed to personal appeals by then-Mayor of London Boris Johnson and then-Prime Minister David Cameron, both prominent Conservative Party politicians, for the group to play at the "winners' parade" taking place shortly after the 2012 Summer Olympics closing ceremony. Enjoying the event's atmosphere and how their stage presence turned into a well-received performance, Tennant subsequently texted Cameron's staff pushing Cameron to use gay scientist Alan Turing's centenary year as impetus for the UK Government to formally pardon Turing. The formal pardon did, in fact, go through on 24 December 2013, with the related official paperwork signed by Queen Elizabeth II.

Tennant has praised the group The Specials and singer-songwriter Elvis Costello, highlighting "Ghost Town" and "Shipbuilding" as protest songs successfully putting politics into pop music.

He has criticized ageism in the music industry, stating in 2013 that radio professionals would tell him that they want to play Pet Shop Boys songs on the air, but will not because the duo, then in their fifties, were considered to be "too old".

Actor David Tennant adopted his stage name from Tennant when joining Equity, as another actor was already registered with his birth name, David McDonald.

See also

Notable alumni of St Cuthbert's High School

References

External links

Pet Shop Boys official website
Neil Tennant discography at Discogs

1954 births
English people of Irish descent
20th-century English male singers
21st-century English male singers
Alumni of the University of North London
British disco musicians
English dance musicians
English male journalists
English music journalists
English male singer-songwriters
English tenors
English pop singers
English gay musicians
Ivor Novello Award winners
English LGBT journalists
English LGBT singers
English LGBT songwriters
Living people
Musicians from Newcastle upon Tyne
People educated at St. Cuthbert's School
People from North Shields
Musicians from Tyne and Wear
Pet Shop Boys members
Electronic (band) members
Gay singers
Gay songwriters
Gay journalists
Former Roman Catholics
20th-century English LGBT people
21st-century English LGBT people
Labour Party (UK) donors